One South Dearborn is a 571 ft (174m) tall skyscraper in Chicago, Illinois. It was constructed from 2003 to 2005 and has 39 floors. DeStefano Keating Partners designed the building, which is the 71st tallest in Chicago as of November 2022. An earlier proposal for the same site proposed a much taller 112-story building. The current anchor tenant is Sidley Austin LLP, which moved into One South Dearborn in November 2005 from Bank One Plaza.

See also
List of tallest buildings in Chicago

References

Emporis
Skyscraperpage

External links

Skyscraper office buildings in Chicago
Office buildings completed in 2005
Leadership in Energy and Environmental Design basic silver certified buildings
2005 establishments in Illinois